Václav Antonín Chotek of Chotkov and Vojnín (26 February 1674 – 2 May 1754) was a Bohemian nobleman and royal Stadtholder in the Kingdom of Bohemia.

Family background
Václav Antonín Chotek of Chotkov and Vojnín was born in Bělušice, Bohemia, on 26 February 1674. His title was knight. He was son of Vilém Chotek of Chotkov and Vojnín (1628–1674) and his second wife Johanna Sabina Proy von Gaiselsberg und Findtelstein (1650–1692).

He married Maria Theresia Ludmilla Scheidler von Scheidlern (1684–1709) on 28 October 1698, in Prague. Maria Theresia was daughter of Ferdinand Christoph (Ritter) Scheidler von Scheidlern, captain of the Prague quarter Malá Strana and High Chamberlain (nejvyšší zemský komorník; Oberstlandkämmerer) of the Kingdom of Bohemia.

He was father of sevel children, including:
 Wenzel Chotek of Chotkow and Wognin (1703–1725).
 Johann Karl, Count Chotek of Chotkow and Wognin (1704–1787).
 Rudolf Chotek of Chotkow and Wognin (de) (1707–1771).

Biographical data
On 6 February 1702, Václav Antonín Chotek Ritter (Knight) of Chotkov and Vojnín was received into the Bohemian nobility in Vienna. On 13 May 1743, in Laxenburg he was awarded the title of Bohemian Graf (Count) and on 4 October 1745, in Frankfurt am Main he was elevated to the rank of Reichsgraf (Imperial Count) with heraldic augmentation.

Owner of the Bělušice estate, Václav Chotek also acquired the Veltrusy estate, where architect František Maxmilián Kaňka erected his new residence, the Veltrusy Mansion in 1716. He later also purchased the Domašín estate, becoming one of the richest landowners in Bohemia.

Václav Chotek was head of the Slaný Landkreis (district) and, thereafter, head of the Litoměřice Landkreis. After these assignments, he was appointed Imperial Counsellor. He also held the position of Austrian Stadtholder of the Kingdom of Bohemia from 1735 to 1738.

Václav Chotek died in Prague on 2 May 1754, age 80.

Literature
Roman Freiherr von Procházka: Genealogisches Handbuch erloschener böhmischer Herrenstandsfamilien, Seite 56, Verlag Degener & Co, Neustadt (Aisch) 1973
 Nachkommerliste des Otto Chotek von Chotkow auf Liblin († nach 1400) 

Czech politicians
Vaclav
Austrian politicians
Bohemian nobility
1674 births
1754 deaths
People from Most District